' Ambodivoananto is a village and commune in the Vatomandry (district) in the Atsinanana Region, Madagascar.

References

Populated places in Atsinanana